Baklaköy is a village in the District of Köşk, Aydın Province, Turkey. , it had a population of 303 people.

References

Villages in Köşk District